Me and My Brother may refer to:
 Me & My Brother, the third studio album by the rap duo Ying Yang Twins
 Me and My Brother (film), a 1969 independent film which was Christopher Walken's film debut
 Me & My Brothers, a Japanese manga series by Hari Tokeino 
 "Me and My Brother", a song by Erik Hill and P-Square from The Invasion